KKLS-FM (104.7 MHz, "Hot 104.7") is a radio station broadcasting a Top 40 (CHR) format. The station serves the Sioux Falls, South Dakota, area. KKLS and its sister stations were owned by Southern Minnesota Broadcasting until 2003 when they were sold to Cumulus Media, and sold again in 2012 to Townsquare Media.

Its studios are located on Tennis Lane in Sioux Falls, while its transmitter is located near Humboldt.

History
In the 1990s, KKLS-FM was oldies formatted "Oldies 104.7" under ownership of Southern Minnesota Broadcasting.

In December 1997, KKLS flipped to CHR as "Hot 104.7", filling a format void that was left by KPAT's flip to hot AC as KMXC in 1992. Prior to the flip, KKCK (then at 99.7 FM, now at 94.7 FM) served as the only Top 40/CHR radio station in the Sioux Falls market between 1992 and 1997.

In 2003, Southern Minnesota Broadcasting sold their Sioux Falls stations to Cumulus Media.  In 2012, it was announced that Cumulus was selling their Sioux Falls stations to Townsquare Media.

Since 2018, Hot 104.7 currently competes against KQSF in the Top 40/CHR format.

External links
Hot 104.7 KKLS-FM official website

KLS-FM
Contemporary hit radio stations in the United States
Radio stations established in 1975
1975 establishments in the United States
Townsquare Media radio stations